The Roman Catholic Diocese of Aného is a diocese located in the city of Aného in the Ecclesiastical province of Lomé in Togo.

History
 July 1, 1994: Established as Diocese of Aného from the Metropolitan Archdiocese of Lomé

Special churches
The Cathedral is Cathédrale Saints Pierre et Paul in Aného

Leadership
 Bishops of Aného (Roman rite)
 Bishop Victor Dovi Hounnaké (July 1, 1994 – August 4, 1995)
 Bishop Paul Jean-Marie Dossavi (February 23, 1996 – September 13, 2005)
 Bishop Isaac Gaglo (February 2, 2009 - current)

See also
Roman Catholicism in Togo

Sources
 GCatholic.org
 Catholic Hierarchy

Roman Catholic dioceses in Togo
Roman Catholic Ecclesiastical Province of Lomé
Christian organizations established in 1994
Roman Catholic dioceses and prelatures established in the 20th century